Átila Roberto de Abreu (born 10 May 1987 in Sorocaba) is a Brazilian racing driver.

Career

Formula BMW
Despite beginning his karting career in 1996, 2003 saw his debut in the Formula BMW ADAC championship with Team Rosberg. Abreu finished ninth in the championship and second in the Rookie Cup with two podiums at Norisring and A1-Ring. He switched teams, joining ADAC Mittelrhein e.V. for 2004 and finished the season as runner-up with two wins at Adria International Raceway and Nürburgring.

Formula Three
In 2005, Abreu stepped up to the Formula 3 Euro Series with Mücke Motorsport. He finished fifteenth in the standings after taking seven point-scoring finishes.

Stock Car Brasil
After competitions in Europe he returned in Brazil for participating in local series, including Stock Car Brasil. In 2008, competed in Stock Car V8, JF Racing team and was elected the pilot surprise team, which finished in eighth place. In 2010, the pilot won the first race of his career in Stock Car.

Stadium Super Trucks
In 2017, Abreu made his Stadium Super Trucks debut at the Detroit Grand Prix, the first Brazilian to compete in the series. He drove the No. 51 truck with sponsorship from Royal Dutch Shell and Monster Energy, the former being his Stock Car Brasil team, while Monster was a sponsor of his in 2013. Abreu finished eleventh in the first race after being involved in an accident on lap five, though he was able to finish the second event in eighth.

Racing record

Career summary

 Season still in progress.

Complete Formula 3 Euro Series results
(key) (Races in bold indicate pole position) (Races in italics indicate fastest lap)

Complete Stock Car Brasil results

References

External links
 Official website 
 Átila Abreu career statistics at Driver Database

1987 births
Living people
People from Sorocaba
Brazilian racing drivers
Formula BMW ADAC drivers
Formula 3 Euro Series drivers
Stock Car Brasil drivers
Blancpain Endurance Series drivers
Stadium Super Trucks drivers
Sportspeople from São Paulo (state)
Team Rosberg drivers
Mücke Motorsport drivers
Eifelland Racing drivers
24H Series drivers